Amatsia Levkovich (27 December 1937 – 4 November 2021) was an Israeli footballer who played as a defender for Hapoel Tel Aviv. He made 42 appearances for the Israel national team from 1957 to 1965.

References

External links
 
 

1937 births
2021 deaths
Israeli footballers
Footballers from Tel Aviv
Hapoel Tel Aviv F.C. players
Liga Leumit players
Israel international footballers
1960 AFC Asian Cup players
1964 AFC Asian Cup players
Israeli Football Hall of Fame inductees
Israeli Footballer of the Year recipients
Association football defenders